Hemacite is a material made from sawdust and the blood of slaughtered cattle and pigs. It was invented and patented by Dr W H Dibble of New Jersey in the last quarter of the nineteenth century. Hydraulic pressure and chemical compounds, blood and sawdust were transformed by Dibble's Hemacite Manufacturing Company into everything from doorknobs and roller skate wheels to cash register buttons and telephone receivers; there is even extensive use in Victorian jewellery. Hemacite was inexpensive but fell out of favor with the popularity of new plastics like Bakelite. It is quite easy to misidentify Hemacite as Bakelite.

Uses
This composition was pre-plastic, and ideal for everything from doorknobs to roller skate wheels to products such as buttons, cash register keys and jewelry. The composition of Hemacite was touted as susceptible to a high polish, impervious to heat, moisture, atmospheric changes, it acted very similarity to the material Pykrete. Hemacite was cheap to produce due to blood and sawdust both being cheap materials.

Decline
Although Hemacite is a cheap material, Bakelite was cheaper to produce, and by the mid to late-1900s the popularity of plastics like Bakelite almost entirely replaced the production of Hemacite.

References

External links

Composite materials
Engineered wood